The High Court of Uganda, also Uganda High Court, is the third-highest judicial organ in Uganda, behind the Supreme Court of Uganda and the Court of Appeal of Uganda. It has "unlimited original jurisdiction", with powers to try any case of any value or crime of any magnitude. It is also mandated to hear all appeals from all Magistrates Courts. High Court judgements are appealable to the Uganda Court of Appeal.

Location
The High Court of Uganda is located at 2 The Square, in Kampala Central Division, one of the five administrative burroughs of Uganda's capital city Kampala. The geographical coordinates of the offices of the Uganda High Court are: 0°18'57.0"N, 32°34'46.0"E (Latitude:0.315833; Longitude:32.579444).

Overview
The High Court of Uganda is headed by the Principal Judge (PJ), who is responsible for management of the court, including assigning duties to member justices of the court. The PJ is also responsible for supervising the Magistrates Courts below the High Court. The PJ does hear cases herself/himself at his/her discretion. The current Principal Judge of Uganda is Justice Flavian Zeija.

The High Court has the following eight divisions: (a) Anti-Corruption Division (b) Civil Division (c) Commercial  Division (d) Criminal Division (e) Execution and Bailiffs Division (f) Family Division (g) International Crimes Division and (h) Land Division.

In addition to the Kampala headquarters, the High Court has the following circuits where cases can be heard closer to the litigants' domicile.

Composition
The Justices of the High Court of Uganda are headed by the Principal Judge of Uganda. The following are the justices of the High Court of Uganda, as of 15 August 2017:

Justices in High Court divisions
The following Hgh court justices are assigned to the divisions of  the Hgh Court of Uganda:
 
 Flavian Zeija: Principal Judge and Head of Court  
 John Wilson Kwesiga: Head of Criminal Division                                   
 Flavia Anglin Senoga: Deputy Head of Criminal Division                         
 Elizabeth Kabanda: Criminal Division 
 Yasin Nyanzi: Land Division
 Stephen Musota: Head of Civil Division                                    
 Margaret Oguli: Deputy Head of Civil Division                        
 Lydia Mugambe: Civil Division
 Henrietta Wolayo: Civil Division
 Christopher Madrama Izama: Head of Executions & Bailiffs                        
 Patricia Basaza Wasswa: Deputy Head of Executions & Bailiffs
 Andrew Bashaija: Head of Land Division                                 
 Godfrey Namundi: Deputy Head of Land Division
 Damalie Lwanga: Land Division
 Henry Kaweesa Isabirye: Land Division
 Alexandra Nkonge Rugadya: Land Division
 Moses Mukiibi: Head, International Crimes Division                           
 Jane Kiggundu: Deputy Head of International Crimes Division 
 Ezekiel Muhanguzi: International Crimes Division
 Lawrence Gidudu: Head of Anti-Corruption Division
 Margaret Tibulya: Deputy Head of Anti-Corruption Division
 David Kutosi Wangutusi: Head of Commercial Division
 Billy Kainamura: Deputy Head of Commercial Division
 Elizabeth Jane Alividza: Commercial Division
 Anna Bitature Mugenyi: Commercial Division
 David Matovu: Deputy Head of Family Division
 Jessica Naiga: Family Division
 Ketrah Kitarisiibwa Katanguka: Family Division.

Justices in High Court circuits
The following justices are assigned to the circuits of the Uganda High Court:

 Albert Rugadya Atwooki: Resident Judge, Masindi
 John Eudes Keitirima: Senior Resident Judge, Masaka
 Duncan Gaswaga: Senior Resident Judge, Mbarara
 Flavian Zeija: Resident Judge, Mbarara
 Eva Luswata: Senior Resident Judge, Jinja
 Michael Elabu: Resident Judge, Jinja
 David Batema: Resident Judge, Soroti
 Oyuko Anthony Ojok: Resident Judge, Fort Portal
 Suzan Okalany: Resident Judge, Mbale
 Stephen Mubiru: Resident Judge, Arua
 Vincent Okwanga: Resident Judge, Gulu
 Winfred Nabisinde: Resident Judge, Lira 
 Moses Kawumi Kazibwe: Resident Judge, Kabale
 Margaret Mutonyi: Resident Judge, Mukono
 Wilson Masalu Musene: Resident Judge, Mpigi
 Joseph Murangira: Resident Judge, Mubende

Justices on special assignments
The following High Court justices are on special assignment:

 Henry Peter Adonyo: Executive Director, Judicial Studies Institute
 Michael Chibita: Director of Public Prosecutions
 Julia Sebutinde: International Court of Justice
 Asaph Ruhundi: Chief Judge, Industrial Court
 Linda Lillian Tumusiime Mugisha: Industrial Court
 Benjamin Kabiito: Chairperson, Judicial Service Commission.

Other high court judges
The following newly-appointed justices of the high court were sworn in on Friday 23 March 2018, by Yoweri Museveni, the president of Uganda, at State House Entebbe.

 Paul Gadenya Walimbwa
 Tadeo Asiimwe
 Emanuel Baguma
 Jane Frances Abodo
 Joyce Kavuma
 Alex Mackay Ajiji
 Olive Kazaarwe Mukwaya
 Cornelia Kakooza Sabiiti
 Musa Sekaana
 Richard Wejuli Wabwire

The following 13 justices of the high court were appointed on Friday 5 October 2019.

 Vincent Emmy Mugabo
 Immaculate Busingye
 Isaac Muwata
 Jesse Byaruhanga Rugyema
 Isah Serunkuuma
 Susan Abinyo
 Esta Nambayo
 Jane Okuo Kajuga
 Boniface Wamala
 Philip Odoki
 Victoria Katamba
 Nakintu Nkwanga
 Jeanne Rwakakoko

See also
Politics of Uganda
Supreme Court of Uganda
Court of Appeal of Uganda

References

External links
Website of the Judiciary of Uganda
The Legal and Institutional Context of the 2006 Elections in Uganda

Government of Uganda
Courts in Uganda
Law of Uganda
Judiciary of Uganda
1995 establishments in Uganda